Liv Sansoz (born 12 February 1977) is a French professional rock climber, ice climber, and base jumper. She is known for being three times World Cup winner and twice World Champion in Lead climbing. She had a year off after a fall but returned and climbed every Alp over 4,000 metres.

Climbing career
Sansoz was born in Bourg-Saint-Maurice in 1977 and grew up in the alps where she discovered climbing. Her parents built her a climbing wall and by 16 she was in the French National team.

She has twice been the world champion and she has won the World Cup three times. She lost her confidence for a year after she cracked a vertebra in her neck after a 10-metre fall. This ended her competitive career but she regained her confidence to climb.

In 2017 she set out to climb every Alpine summit over 4,000 metres in a year. By July she was suffering from sleep deprivation but she had climbed 48 peaks combining the descent with skiing and paragliding when it was possible. Sometimes she was waking at three in the morning and then climbing for over 12 hours in a day.

Rankings

Climbing World Cup

Climbing World Championships

Number of medals in the Climbing World Cup

Lead

Notable climbs

Redpointed 
:
 Hasta La Vista - Mount Charleston (USA) - 1 August 2000 - Second female ascent of an 8c+ route

:
 Route of all evil - Virgin River Gorge (USA) - 8 April 2001
 Soul of train - Mount Charleston (USA) - 20 August 2000

:
 White Wedding - Smith Rock (USA) - 6 May 2008
 Fox et Mathews - Orgon (FRA) - 9 April 1999
 Rio de janvier - Calanques (FRA) - 1 March 1998
 Sortilège - Cimaï (FRA) - 1 May 1996

Onsighted 
:
 Berlin - Céüse (FRA)
 War Lords - Mount Charleston (USA) - 1 August 2000
 Le Danti - Calanques (FRA)

Big wall 
 Super Cirill - Ticino (SUI) - 2010
 The Nose - El Capitan (USA) - 2008

References

External links 

1977 births
Living people
People from Bourg-Saint-Maurice
French rock climbers
Sportspeople from Savoie
IFSC Climbing World Championships medalists
IFSC Climbing World Cup overall medalists